Privateer 2: The Darkening is a space flight simulation game that was released in 1996 for MS-DOS and published by Electronic Arts under the Origin Systems brand. It is a sequel to Wing Commander: Privateer.

The game features live-action video scenes, directed by Steve Hilliker, which are discovered as the plot progresses. The cast included Clive Owen, Mathilda May, John Hurt, Christopher Walken, Brian Blessed and Amanda Pays. Dani Behr voiced the onboard computer, also named Dani. The game also featured David Warner, and Jürgen Prochnow, who later played Admiral Geoffrey Tolwyn and Commander Paul Gerald, respectively, in the Wing Commander feature film. The filming was done at Pinewood Studios in England.

After the game's release, some people from the developer, EA Manchester, went on to found Warthog Games, developer of the space simulator Starlancer. GOG.com released an emulated version of Privateer 2 for Microsoft Windows in 2013.

Synopsis
In a remote region of the Wing Commander universe in the Tri-System Confederation (a three system government that has an almost three thousand-year history of its own parallel to the Terran Confederation history), the cargo ship Canera is attacked during landing and crashes into Mendra City on planet Crius in the year 2790 of the Tri-System calendar (the calendar appears to be longer than a Terran year with months that are about 40 days each). One survivor, As Lev Arris, a man in a fugue state with no memory of who he is and no record of his existence prior to two weeks before the crash, awakens from his cryo-sleep and must take on the life of a privateer in the Tri-System, re-discovering his past along the way.

Development
The game had a development budget of $5 million.

Reception

A Next Generation critic said Privateer 2 "has rejuvenated the genre". He commented that while it emulates the plotline of the mainline Wing Commander series, which he said had been widely criticized, it at least gives players the option of ignoring the plot. He also praised the graphics, frame rate, flight mechanics, support for most flight sticks and throttles, and upgradeable ships, though he noted several glitches and the lack of Windows 95 support. Greg Kasavin of GameSpot was more vehement about these two issues, saying they make the game feel like a rushed product. He also criticized it as being a Wing Commander game in name only, with no apparent connection to the rest of the series. However, he concluded that "if you can accept its multiple shortcomings, you will find that Privateer 2 is actually a fairly solid game", citing the flight mechanics, graphics, plot, acting, and massive length. Privateer 2 was a runner-up for Computer Game Entertainments 1996 "Best Action Game" prize, which ultimately went to Duke Nukem 3D. The editors wrote: "Not quite as freewheeling as the original, Privateer 2 is still a fluid, immersive and enjoyable game experience".

References

External links
 
 Privateer 2: The Darkening at Wing Commander Encyclopedia

1996 video games
Action-adventure games
Adventure games set in space
DOS games
Electronic Arts games
Full motion video based games
Games commercially released with DOSBox
Origin Systems games
Science fiction video games
Space trading and combat simulators
Video game sequels
Video games about pirates
Video games developed in the United Kingdom
Windows games
Wing Commander (franchise)
Video games about amnesia
Video games set in the 28th century
Single-player video games